Park Jong-won (born 20 October 1960) is a South Korean film director and screenwriter.

Filmography 
Kuro Arirang (1989)
Our Twisted Hero (1992)
The Eternal Empire (1994)
Seven Reasons Why Beer Is Better Than a Lover (1996) 
Rainbow Trout (1999)
Paradise Villa (2001)

Awards 
1992 13th Blue Dragon Film Awards: Best Director (Our Twisted Hero)
1995 33rd Grand Bell Awards: Best Director (The Eternal Empire)

References

External links 
 
 

1960 births
Living people
South Korean film directors
South Korean screenwriters
Best Director Paeksang Arts Award (film) winners